This is a list of compositions by Theodor Kirchner.

Piano

Piano Solo
Zehn Klavierstücke, Op. 2
Grüße an meine Freunde, Op. 5
Albumleaves, Op. 7
Scherzo, Op. 8
16 Preludes, Op. 9
Skizzen, Op. 11
Adagio quasi Fant, Op. 12
Lieder ohne Worte, Op. 13
Neun Fantasiestücke, Op. 14
Kleine Lust- und Trauerspiele, Op. 16
Neue Davidsbündlertänze, Op. 17
Legenden, Op. 18
Zehn Klavierstücke nach eigenen Liedern, Op. 19
Aquarellen, Op. 21
Acht Romanzen, Op. 22
12 Waltzes, Op. 23
Still und bewegt, Op. 24
Nachtbilder, Op. 25
Album, Op. 26
Six Caprices, Op. 27
Notturnos, Op. 28
Aus meinem Skizzenbuch, Op. 29
Studien und Stücke, Op. 30
Im Zwielicht, Op. 31
Aus trüben Tagen, Op. 32
Ideale, Op. 33
Seven Waltzes, Op. 34
Game Material (14 easy Piano Pieces), Op. 35
Fantasien am Klavier, Op. 36
Vier Elegien, Op. 37
12 Etudes, Op. 38
Dorfgeschichten, Op. 39
Verwehte Blätter, Op. 41
Mazurkas, Op. 42
Four Polonaises, Op. 43/1
Polonaise, Op. 43/2
Blumen zum Strauß, Op. 44
Sechs Stücke für Klavier, Op. 45
30 Kinder- und Künstlertänze, Op. 46
Federzeichnungen, Op. 47
Sechs Humoresken, Op. 48
New Album Leaves: 2 Character Pieces, Op. 49
An Stephen Heller, Op. 51
Ein neues Klavierbuch, Op. 52
Florestan und Eusebius, Op. 53
Zweites Scherzo, Op. 54
New Scenes of Childhood, Op. 55
Fruhlingsgruß, Op. 56
Plaudereien am Klavier, Op. 60
Charakterstücke, Op. 61
Miniaturen, Op. 62
Gavotten, Menuetten und lyrische Stücke, Op. 64
60 Preludes, Op. 65
Lieblinge der Jugend, Op. 66
Five Sonatines, Op. 70
100 kleine Studien für Klavier, Op. 71
Quiet Songs and Dances, Op. 72
Romantische Geschichten, Op. 73
Alte Erinnerungen, Op. 74
Neun Stücke für Klavier, Op. 75
Reflexes, Op. 76
Polonaise, Op. 77/1
Waltz, Op. 77/2
Länder, Op. 77/3
Les Mois de l'Année, Op. 78
Eight Pieces for Piano Solo, Op. 79
Albumblätter (Neue Folge), Op. 80
Gedenkblätter, Op. 82
Bunte Blätter, Op. 83
Eight Nocturnes, Op. 87
Aus der Jugendzeit, Op. 88
Zwölf Fantasiestücke, Op. 90
Confidences, Op. 96
Wolkenbilder, Op. 100
Memoryleave, Op. 101
Waltz, Op. 104
36 rhythmische und melodische Etüden, Op. 105
Vorbereitungsstudien, Op. 106
Deutsche Walzer
Bilder aus Osten von Robert Schumann, Transcription for Solo Piano
Spanische Tänze von Sarasate for Piano
2 Danses italiennes
Danses hongroises de J. Brahms
Diana und Mars
Liebeslieder Walzer von Johannes Brahms, Transcriptions for Solo Piano
Lieblinge der Jugend
10 Lieder von Frédéric Chopin, Transcriptions for Solo Piano
Morceau melancolique
5 Petits Preludes
Stücke für Enkel
Tempo de Valse
Walzer von Tchaikovsky from the Serenade for String Orchestra, Transcription for Solo Piano

Piano, Four hands
Zwölf Originalkompositionen for Piano, Four hands, Op. 57
Zwei Märsche for Piano, Four hands, Op. 94
Alte Bekannte im neuen Gewande for Piano, Four hands

Two Pianos
Variationen über ein eigenes Thema for Two Pianos, Op. 85
Seven Waltzes for Two Pianos, Op. 86

Organ
13 Orgelkompositionen for Organ

Chamber music

Violin and Piano
Schlummerlied und Romanze for Violin and Piano, Op. 63
12 Fantasiestücke for Violin and Piano, Op. 90
Albumblatt for Violin and Piano

Cello and Piano
Eight Pieces for Cello and Piano, Op. 79

Piano Trio
Ein Gedenkblatt for Piano Trio, Op. 15
15 Kindertrios for Piano Trio, Op. 58
12 Novelleten for Piano Trio, Op. 59
Zwiegsang for Piano Trio, Op. 83/1
Humoreske for Piano Trio, Op. 83/2
Romanze for Piano Trio, Op. 83/3
Scherzino for Piano Trio, Op. 83/4
Novellette for Piano Trio, Op. 83/5
Lied ohne Worte for Piano Trio, Op. 83/6
Barcarola for Piano Trio, Op. 83/7
Serenata for Piano Trio, Op. 83/8
Erzählung for Piano Trio, Op. 83/9
Mädchenlied for Piano Trio, Op. 83/10
Capriccio for Piano Trio, Op. 83/11
Abenmusik for Piano Trio, Op. 83/12
Two Terzette for Piano Trio, Op. 97
Two Terzette for Piano Trio, Op. 99
Serenade in E Major for Piano Trio
Kleines Trio for Piano Trio
Six Pieces in Canonic Form for Piano Trio (after Robert Schumann's Op. 56)
Humoresque for Piano Trio

Piano Quartet
Piano Quartet in C Minor, Op. 84

String Quartet
String Quartet in G Major, Op. 20
Nur Tropfen for String Quartet

Other
Two Pieces for Violin and Organ, Op. 91
Two Pieces for Cello and Organ, Op. 92

Choral Music
Vier Gedichte von Goethe, Op. 69
Volkslieder, Op. 93
Die heilige Nacht
Schweizers Heimweh

Lieder
Zehn Lieder, Op. 1
Mädchenlieder, Op. 3
Vier Lieder, Op. 4
Funf Lieder, Op. 6
Zwei Könige, Op. 10
Drei Gedichte, Op. 40
Sechs Lieder, Op. 50
Liebeserwachen, Op. 67
Nähe des Geliebten, Op. 68
Sechs Lieder, Op. 81
Ich wandere durch die stille Nacht, Op. 95
Heinrich in Canossa, Op. 102
Ein schöner Stern geht auf, Op. 103
Bitten
Bitte weil auf mir
Du wundersüsses Kind
Ich hab im Traum geweint
Singe, weine, bete
Wiegenlied Eia Popeia

External links
List of compositions (in German)
List of compositions

Kirchner, Theodor